Richard Kahan is a Canadian television actor and writer. He is known for his role as Marco Pacella in the television series The 4400 and for his role as Gil Kurvers on the Canadian television series teen soap Edgemont.

Film

Television

Other works

External links 

1980 births
Canadian male television actors
Living people